Haidamaki is an epic poem by Taras Shevchenko about the Koliivshchyna led by Maksym Zalizniak and Ivan Gonta.

The poem was written in about 1839–1841 and first published in full as a separate book in Saint Petersburg in 1841.  It is dedicated to his friend, artist, Vasyl Ivanovych Hryhorovych.

See also

 Izbornyk
 Koliivshchyna (film)
 List of Ukrainian-language poets
 List of Ukrainian-language writers
 Ukrainian literature

References

External links
Translation by John Weir

Ukrainian literature
Taras Shevchenko
Ukrainian-language books
1841 poems